Mildred Lillington Blaxter (née Hall, 27 March 1925 – 29 August 2010) was a British sociologist and writer. According to her obituary in The Guardian, she "shed new light on the causes of deprivation".

Early life
She was born Mildred Lillington Hall on 27 March 1925 in Jesmond, Newcastle-upon-Tyne, the elder child and only daughter of Robert Charlton Hall, a bank manager, and his wife, Mildred Violet Hall, née Gleed (1897–1963), an actress. She was educated at St Anne's College, Oxford, and earned a bachelor's degree in English in 1949, and was the first woman to be assistant editor of the student newspaper, Isis.

Career
Blaxter was in her 40s, and her children were at school, when she read Peter Townsend's study of old people's homes The Last Refuge, and decided she wanted to be a sociologist.

In 1967, she enrolled at the newly established department of sociology at the University of Aberdeen, alongside Raymond Illsley, Gordon Horobin, Phil Strong, and Alan Davies, and earned a master's degree in 1972, becoming a medical sociologist.

In 1972, she was appointed to the Aberdeen-based Medical Sociology Unit, as scientific officer. In 1976, Blaxter published her first book, The Meaning of Disability. Her 1982 book, Mothers and Daughters is considered "a classic".

In 1982, when her husband retired, she joined the University of East Anglia, rising to professor of medical sociology in 2000, and was senior sociologist at the University of Cambridge. In 1990, she published Health and Lifestyles. Her last book came out in 2004, Health: Key Concepts.

Selected publications
The Meaning of Disability
Mothers and Daughters
Health and Lifestyles
Health: Key Concepts

Personal life
On 12 October 1957, she married Kenneth Blaxter (1919–1991), an animal nutritionist, and they had three children.

Later life
She died of lung cancer on 29 August 2010 at Weston Hospicecare, Uphill, Weston-super-Mare.

References

1925 births
2010 deaths
British sociologists
Academics of the University of East Anglia
Alumni of St Anne's College, Oxford
Academics of the University of Cambridge
Writers from Newcastle upon Tyne
Deaths from lung cancer in England
British women sociologists
Medical sociologists